The 1958 Merdeka Tournament was the second edition of the annual tournament hosted by Malaya.  It took place from August 30 to September 4 with five participating nations.

Table

Results

References
RSSSF

Merdeka Cup
Merd
Merd
Merd